Norway Township is a township in Winnebago County, Iowa, in the USA.

History
Norway Township was founded in 1864. It was originally settled chiefly by Norwegians, hence the name.

References

Townships in Winnebago County, Iowa
Townships in Iowa